Gilbert Baruti (born 16 March 1992) is a Botswanan football midfielder who currently plays for Jwaneng Galaxy.

References

1992 births
Living people
Botswana footballers
Botswana international footballers
Botswana Police XI SC players
Jwaneng Galaxy F.C. players
Association football midfielders